The Lokavibhāga is a Jain cosmological text originally composed in Prakrit  by a Digambara monk, Sarvanandi, surviving in a later Sanskrit translation by one Siṃhasūri. It the oldest known Indian source to use zero as number. Surviving manuscripts of the Lokavibhāga are listed in v.26 of the New Catalogus Catalogorum.    Parts of the Bakhshali Manuscript on arithmetic, which does use a physically written symbol for zero, have been carbon-dated, but the results of this dating are puzzling and are still being debated. 

The printed edition of the Lokavibhāga states that the original Prakrit work was composed by Sarvanandin at Patalika in the Banarastra on a certain day the astronomical details of which are given. These correspond to 458 CE. The surviving text is a Sanskrit translation of Sarvanandin's work by one Simhasūri, made "some considerable time" after that date of Sarvanandin.

References

Jain texts
Agamas
Ancient Indian literature
5th-century books
458
Indian mathematics
5th century in India